The GiMA Best Female Playback Singer Award is given by Global Indian Music Academy as a part of its annual Global Indian Music Academy Awards to recognise a female playback singer who has delivered an outstanding performance in a film song.

Superlatives

List of winners
 2010 Kavita Seth for "Iktara"  – Wake Up Sid
 2011 Sunidhi Chauhan for "Sheila Ki Jawani"  – Tees Maar Khan
 Mamta Sharma for "Munni Badnaam Hui" – Dabangg
 Sunidhi Chauhan for "Ainvayi Ainvayi" – Band Baaja Baaraat
 Sunidhi Chauhan for "Udi" – Guzaarish
 Usha Uthup & Rekha Bhardwaj for "Darling" – 7 Khoon Maaf
 2012 Nandini Srikar for "Bhare Naina"  – Ra.One
 Harshdeep Kaur for "Katiya Karun" – Rockstar
 Shreya Ghoshal for "Chikni Chameli" – Agneepath
 Shreya Ghoshal for "Saibo" – Shor in the City
 Shreya Ghoshal for "Ooh La La" – The Dirty Picture
 Sunidhi Chauhan for "Gun Gun Guna" – Agneepath
 2013 – No award given
 2014 Shreya Ghoshal for "Sunn Raha Hai"  – Aashiqui 2
 Bhoomi Trivedi for "Ram Chahe Leela" – Goliyon Ki Raasleela Ram-Leela
 Monali Thakur for "Sawaar Loon" – Lootera
 Shreya Ghoshal for "Banarasiya" – Raanjhanaa
 Sunidhi Chauhan for "Kamli" – Dhoom 3
 2015 Kanika Kapoor for "Baby Doll" – Ragini MMS 2
 Alia Bhatt for "Samjhawan (Unplugged)" – Humpty Sharma Ki Dulhania
 Nandini Srikar for "Harjaiyaan" – Queen
 Nooran Sisters for "Pataka Guddi" – Highway
 Rekha Bhardwaj for "Aaj Ke Naam" – Haider
 Sunidhi Chauhan for "Tu Kuja" – Highway
 2016 Shreya Ghoshal for "Deewani Mastani" – Bajirao Mastani
 Kanika Kapoor for "Chittiyaan Kalaiyaan" – Roy
 Alka Yagnik for "Agar Tum Saath Ho" – Tamasha
 Jyoti Nooran for "Ghani Bawri" – Tanu Weds Manu Returns
 Shreya Ghoshal for "Mohe Rang Do Laal" – Bajirao Mastani
 Monali Thakur for "Moh Moh Ke Dhaage" – Dum Laga Ke Haisha
2017- "No Award given"

See also

 List of music awards honoring women
 Bollywood
 Cinema of India

References

Global Indian Music Academy Awards
Music awards honoring women